Houston is an unincorporated community in Union County, North Carolina, United States.

References
 
 

Unincorporated communities in Union County, North Carolina
Unincorporated communities in North Carolina